Suzette Mayr is a Canadian novelist who has written five critically acclaimed novels.  Currently a  professor at the University of Calgary's Faculty of Arts, Mayr's works have both won and been nominated for several literary awards.

Biography

Suzette Mayr was born in Calgary, Alberta. Originally planning to study science in her post-secondary career, Mayr changed focus due to her strong performance in English. A creative writing course at the University of Calgary led to her decision to pursue a writing career. She graduated with an Honours bachelor's degree in English. Following her graduation from the University of Calgary, Mayr went on to acquire a Master of Arts in Creative Writing from the University of Alberta and a PhD from the University of New South Wales.

Mayr worked as a waitress and sandwich maker before establishing herself as a professional writer. In addition to her six novels (Moon Honey, The Widows, Venous Hum, Monoceros, Dr. Edith Vane and the Hares of Crawley Hall, and The Sleeping Car Porter), Mayr has published books of poetry and co-edited a literary anthology. Her novels and other literary works have been nominated for several awards. In 2002, Mayr participated in the Calgary Distinguished Writers Program at the University of Calgary, where she is now a professor in the Department of English and teaches courses on creative writing and contemporary literature studies. Mayr, a Canadian of German and Afro-Caribbean background, often explores issues of race, identity and sex in her writing through the stylistic use of humour, cultural mythologies and surreal imagery.

Novels

Moon Honey (1995)

When eighteen-year-old white waitress Carmen becomes black, her fiancé Griffin is delighted, having 'always wanted to sleep with a black woman.' However, his racist mother Fran is furious that Griffin still wants to marry her. Fran is married to a man called God, and having an affair with her boss. While Griffin is away in Europe for six months, Carmen sleeps with his best friend. Upon Griffin's return, he informs Carmen he does not want to marry her, but rather he wants to marry Renata, a woman he met while overseas, who later runs off with a lesbian liquor store cashier. Moon Honey was published by NeWest Press.

The Widows (1998)

Hannelore Schmitt, Frau Schnadelhuber and Fraulein Clotilde are elderly German immigrant women who are determined to plunge over Niagara Falls in a barrel, aided by Schmitt's granddaughter Cleopatra Maria. The narration of the novel moves between the day they go over the Falls, and the events that lead up to that day. The novel is coloured with quotes from various individuals who went over the falls, including Annie Edson Taylor (the first person to survive riding over Niagara Falls in a barrel), who becomes a character in the story. The Widows was published by NeWest Press. The novel was translated into German by Christine Struh and Ursula Wukfekamp in 1999, with the title 3 Witwen und ein Wasserfall

Venous Hum (2004)

Venous hum is the benign condition experienced by Lai Fun Kugelheim, the protagonist of the novel, in which one can hear the vibration, or hum, of one's own blood as it flows through his or her veins. When an old high school acquaintance dies, Lai Fun and her best friend Stefanja Dumanowski are moved to organize a 20-year reunion. As Lai Fun deals with the challenges of her self-appointed task, her same-sex marriage is falling apart as she has an affair with Stefanja's husband. Adding to Lai Fun's problems, her mother is an immigrant vampire vegetarian who cares only for her daughter's happiness. Venous Hum has been described as 'a funny, insightful, sexy, intelligent horror novel with memorable characters that never takes itself too seriously.'  The novel was published by Arsenal Pulp Press.

Monoceros (2011)

Monoceros was Mayr's fourth published novel. Its story revolves around the suicide of a 17-year-old bullying victim and the effect it has on the people who were directly and indirectly involved in his life. Monoceros was published by Coach House Books. The book was inspired in part by a real-life incident of anti-gay bullying at the high school where Mayr's partner was teaching.

Dr. Edith Vane and the Hares of Crawley Hall (2017)

Dr. Edith Vane and the Hares of Crawley Hall is a satirical take on university politics as seen through the eyes of a young and optimistic English professor.

The Sleeping Car Porter (2022)
The Sleeping Car Porter, published in 2022, centres on R.T. Baxter, a closeted gay Black Canadian man working as a porter on a cross-Canada railway. Publishers Weekly named it one of the top ten works of fiction published in 2022.

The novel was the winner of the 2022 Giller Prize, and was longlisted for the inaugural Carol Shields Prize for Fiction in 2023.

Anthologies

Boundless Alberta (1993)

"Scalps" was Mayr's first story to be included in an anthology. Boundless Alberta was edited by Aritha Van Herk and published by NeWest Pres.

Eye Wuz Here (1996)

Mayr's "Glass Anatomy" is included in this collection of stories by women writers under the age of 30. Eye Wuz Here was published by Douglas & McIntyre.

Threshold (1999)

Mayr's story "Toot Suite Matricia" is included in this collection of literary stories by Albertan authors. Threshold was published by the University of Alberta Press.

And Other Stories (2001)

Mayr's story "Nipple Gospel" is included in this anthology of stories by Canadian authors written in a postmodern style. And Other Stories was edited by George Bowering and published by Talonbooks.

Broadview Anthology of Short Fiction (2004) 

Published by Broadview Press and edited by Mayr and Julia Gaunce, this anthology includes 26 stories and spans from the 19th to 21st century. The stories are organized chronologically and contain annotations for student readers.

So Long Been Dreaming (2004)

Mayr's short story "Toot Sweet Matricia" is included in an anthology for the second time. So Long Been Dreaming, edited by Nalo Hopkinson and Uppinder Mehan, contains science fiction and fantasy stories by authors of Aboriginal, African or Asian descent and was published by Arsenal Pulp Press.

Poetry

Zebra Talk (1991) 

Published by disOrientation chapbooks, Zebra Talk is a collection of poems in chapbook form dealing with the marginalization of both mixed race and homosexual peoples.

Tale (2001)

Published by Stride Gallery, Tale is a collection of illustrated poems (illustrations by Geoff Hunter) referencing the personal experiences of both Mayr and Hunter. The collection explores relationships, sexuality and love.

Awards

Mayr's first published novel, Moon Honey, was nominated for two Alberta Literary Awards: the Georges Bugnet Award for Best Novel and the Henry Kreisel Award for Best First book. The Widows, Mayr's second novel, was shortlisted for the Commonwealth Writers' Prize for best book in the Canadian-Caribbean region.

Mayr's fourth novel, Monoceros, won the Relit and W. O. Mitchell Awards. It was also nominated for a Ferro-Grumley Award, and longlisted for the 2011 Giller Prize.

In 2022, Mayr won the Giller Prize for her novel The Sleeping Car Porter.

Other
Mayr is a past president of the Writers' Guild of Alberta. In 2010, she served on the jury for the Dayne Ogilvie Prize, a literary award for emerging LGBT writers in Canada, selecting Nancy Jo Cullen as that year's prize winner.

References

External links
 In Silhouette: Portraits of Alberta Writers at Fontenac House, 2009, by Bob Stallworthy (See pages 118–124 for detailed profile of Suzette Mayr).
 Suzette Mayr's University of Calgary profile

Canadian women novelists
University of Alberta alumni
Writers from Calgary
Academic staff of the University of Calgary
Living people
Black Canadian writers
Canadian lesbian writers
1967 births
20th-century Canadian novelists
21st-century Canadian novelists
Canadian LGBT novelists
20th-century Canadian women writers
21st-century Canadian women writers
People educated at Western Canada High School
Black Canadian women
Black Canadian LGBT people
Lesbian novelists
21st-century Canadian LGBT people
20th-century Canadian LGBT people